Advision Studios was a recording studio in Fitzrovia, central London, England.

Origins
Founded in the 1960s by Guy Whetstone and Stephen Appleby, Advision originally provided voiceovers and jingles for television advertisements. The studio was initially located at 83 New Bond Street, but moved to 23 Gosfield Street in 1969. The studio complex was built to be able to house a 60-piece studio orchestra and had a 35mm film projector screen for synchronising with motion picture images. Producer Martin Rushent began his career as a projectionist at Advision.

History
By the mid-1960s, Advision had become one of the top London studios for rock and pop music. The Yardbirds recorded their 1966 album Roger the Engineer at Advision on a four-track machine. The Move recorded some of their early hits at Advision, engineered by Gerald Chevin, including "Flowers in the Rain" in July 1967. In early 1968, Advision became one of the first studios in the United Kingdom to obtain an eight-track machine. The Advision unit was built in the United States by Scully Recording Instruments. Among the first artists to use the eight-track machine were T. Rex, the Who and Caravan. In 1970, the studio used a custom 24-channel desk with an eight-track recorder. Advision was also among the first studios in the UK to install 16- and 24-track machines in the early 1970s. 

In 1971, a 20-channel Neve console was added to the mixdown suite. During the 1970s the studios' focus moved towards progressive rock music, and the company began producing music for bands such as Yes, Gentle Giant, Emerson, Lake & Palmer and Premiata Forneria Marconi, as well as Jeff Wayne's Musical Version of The War of the Worlds.

A 1974 re-fitting gave the studio a console built in California by Quad-Eight Electronics for quadraphonic mixing, and the UK's first computer-aided mixdown desk. Producers and engineers who worked at Advision include Eddy Offord, Eddie Kramer, Martin Rushent, Paul Northfield and Hugh Padgham.

The Gosfield Street location has been occupied since 1993 by a studio called The Sound Company.

Partial discography

References

External links
Photograph from Advision Studios in New Bond Street (Photo was taken in December 1968. The Scully 8-track recorder can be seen in the background.)
The Sound Company Ltd History of 23 Gosfield Street London at sound.co.uk (with full Advision client list)

Year of disestablishment missing
Recording studios in London
Former recording studios